Jeckyll & Hyde is the stage name of the Dutch producer Maarten Vorwerk. His first commercial hit, "Frozen Flame", reached #11 on the Dutch Top 40 charts. The second single from The Album, "Freefall", reached #1 in the Dutch Top 40 charts, making it the first instrumental #1 hit in the Netherlands since 1995. "Time Flies", the third single, has also been receiving major airplay on Dutch TV and radio stations.

Discography
 Kick This One (Vinyl, 2005)
 Precious Dreamer (Vinyl, 2005)
 Frozen Flame (EP, 2006)
 Freefall (EP, 2007)
 Time Flies (EP, 2007)
 The Album (Album, 2007)
 Spring Break / Break It Down'' (EP, 2009)

Reception 
Jeckyll & Hyde received two TMF Award nominations in 2007 - the TMF Party Award and the TMF Radio Hit Award - winning the TMF Party Award.

The origin of the name Jeckyll & Hyde comes from the book Strange Case of Dr Jeckyll & Mister Hyde from Robert Louis Stevenson published in 1886.

References

External links 
 Jeckyll & Hyde's Official Site
 Official Biography
 

Techno music groups
Dutch electronic music groups
Living people
Year of birth missing (living people)